Aliabad-e Posht Shahr (also Romanized as ‘Alīābād-e Posht Shahr and ‘Alīābād-e Posht-e Shahr; also known as Alīābād, ‘Alīābād, and ‘Alīābād-e Posht) is a village in Hegmataneh Rural District, in the Central District of Hamadan County, Hamadan Province, Iran. At the 2006 census, its population was 4,453, in 1,137 families.

References 

Populated places in Hamadan County